934 Thüringia (prov. designation:  or ) is a dark background asteroid, approximately  in diameter, located in the central region of the asteroid belt. It was discovered on 15 August 1920, by astronomer Walter Baade at the Bergedorf Observatory in Hamburg, Germany. The hydrated C-type asteroid has a rotation period of 8.2 hours and is likely irregular in shape. It was named after the German state of Thuringia. The naming was inspired by the ocean liner SS Thuringia.

Orbit and classification 

Thüringia is a non-family asteroid of the main belt's background population when applying the hierarchical clustering method to its proper orbital elements. It orbits the Sun in the central asteroid belt at a distance of 2.2–3.3 AU once every 4 years and 7 months (1,667 days; semi-major axis of 2.75 AU). Its orbit has an eccentricity of 0.22 and an inclination of 14° with respect to the ecliptic. The body's observation arc begins at the Vienna Observatory on 2 September 1920, or 18 nights after its official discovery observation at Hamburg Observatory.

Naming 

This minor planet was named after the German state of Thuringia. The naming was proposed by the captain of the ocean liner SS Thuringia, which was a ship in the fleet of the Hamburg America Line, on which the discoverer, Walter Baade, travelled twice on his visits to New York in the 1920s. As the captain of the SS Thuringia was an amateur astronomer, he was invited by Baade to name one of his discoveries. The  was mentioned in The Names of the Minor Planets by Paul Herget in 1955.

Physical characteristics 

In the Bus–Binzel SMASS classification, Thüringia is a hydrated, carbonaceous C-type asteroid (Ch).

Rotation period and pole 

In October 1998, a rotational lightcurve of Thüringia was obtained from photometric observations by astronomers of the Minnesota State University Moorhead at Paul Feder Observatory. Analysis of the classically shaped bimodal lightcurve gave a well-defined rotation period of  hours with a high brightness variation of  magnitude, indicative of an irregular, non-spherical shape. In October 2007, another period determination by Federico Manzini, Hiromi Hamanowa and Hiroko Hamanowa determined a period of  hours and an amplitude of  magnitude. In 2011, a modeled lightcurve using data from the Uppsala Asteroid Photometric Catalogue (UAPC) and other sources gave a sidereal period 8.16534 hours, as well as a spin axis of (120.0°, −52.0°) in ecliptic coordinates (λ, β).

Diameter and albedo 

The Collaborative Asteroid Lightcurve Link derives an albedo of 0.0564 and a diameter of 53.45 km based on an absolute magnitude of 10.1.

References

External links 
 Lightcurve Database Query (LCDB), at www.minorplanet.info
 Dictionary of Minor Planet Names, Google books
 Asteroids and comets rotation curves, CdR – Geneva Observatory, Raoul Behrend
 Discovery Circumstances: Numbered Minor Planets (1)-(5000) – Minor Planet Center
 
 

000934
Discoveries by Walter Baade
Named minor planets
000934
19200815